Unió Esportiva Rapitenca is a Spanish football team based in Sant Carles de la Ràpita, in the autonomous community of Catalonia. Founded in 1930 it currently plays in Tercera División – Group 5, holding home matches at Estadi Municipal La Devesa, which holds 3,000 spectators.

History 
The club was officially founded on November 6, 1930. However the news about the foundation of UE Rapitenca appeared in the magazine "Crítica" one week earlier on October 30.

Season to season

12 seasons in Tercera División

Famous players
 Baba Sule

References

External links
Official website 

Football clubs in Catalonia
Association football clubs established in 1930
1930 establishments in Spain